William Kidd may refer to:

William Kidd (1645–1701), "Captain Kidd", Scottish sailor and pirate
William Kidd (painter) (1796–1863), Scottish painter
William Kidd (composer), musician, orchestrator, and composer
William Matthew Kidd (1918–1998), United States federal judge
Bill Kidd (born 1956), Scottish National Party politician
Bill Kidd (American politician) (born 1952), member of the Missouri House of Representatives
Billy Kidd (born 1943), American ski racer
Billy Kidd (footballer) (1908–1978), English professional footballer
Billy Kidd (American football) (born 1959), American football center

See also
William Kyd (fl. 1430–1453), English pirate
William The Kid (disambiguation)